Haplochromis perrieri is a species of cichlid endemic to Lake Victoria though it may now be extinct in the wild. These fish are part of the Lake Victoria Species Survival Program, and captive populations exist within the public aquarium community.  This species can reach a length of  SL. This species' specific name honours the French zoologist Edmond Perrier (1844-1921) who was the director of Muséum National d’Histoire Naturelle from 1900–1919.

References

perrieri
Fish described in 1909
Taxonomy articles created by Polbot